The Finest Hours is a 2016 American action thriller film directed by Craig Gillespie and produced by Walt Disney Pictures. The screenplay, written by Eric Johnson, Scott Silver, and Paul Tamasy, is based on The Finest Hours: The True Story of the U.S. Coast Guard's Most Daring Sea Rescue by Michael J. Tougias and Casey Sherman.

The Finest Hours was released in the Disney Digital 3D, RealD 3D, and IMAX 3D formats on January 29, 2016. The film received mixed reviews from critics, and was a box office flop, grossing just $52 million against its $70–80 million production budget.

Plot
Bernard "Bernie" Webber, a crewman at Coast Guard Station Chatham, Massachusetts, on Cape Cod, has fallen in love with a local girl, Miriam Pentinen.  The two plan to marry on April 16, but in accordance with Coast Guard regulations, Bernie must seek permission from the station's commanding officer, Chief Warrant Officer Daniel Cluff, although it is usually just a formality. On the day he is due to ask permission, February 18, 1952, the oil tanker  shears in half off the Chatham coast after getting caught in a nor'easter. With the majority of the station's crew already underway with the rescue of the similarly damaged , Bernie is dispatched to pilot motor lifeboat CG 36500 to rescue the crew of Pendleton. Andrew Fitzgerald, Ervin Maske, and Richard P. Livesey volunteer to join Bernie on the rescue mission.

Meanwhile, the Pendletons engineer, Ray Sybert, as the surviving senior officer, organizes the surviving seamen to steer the sinking stern of the tanker onto a submerged reef, where it can lodge until rescuers arrive. Miriam learns that Bernie is leading the rescue effort and believes it to be a suicide mission. Few people in Chatham trust Cluff, believing him to be incapable of doing his job because he is not from the area. Miriam drives to the station, demanding that Cluff call Bernie back. Cluff refuses, and brusquely orders Miriam out.

Between Chatham Harbor and the open sea lies a bar, a series of shoals that are very dangerous even in good weather. Bernie must time bursts of his engine to ride each approaching wave before it breaks as he pilots CG 36500 across the bar. Although he makes it over the bar, he loses his compass.

Bernie steers CG 36500 to the stricken tanker. Although his boat's designated capacity is only 12 people, Bernie manages to rescue 32 crewmen. The stern of Pendleton begins sinking more rapidly during the rescue and goes down shortly after the last crewman comes aboard Bernie's boat.  Relying on his knowledge of the coast and prevailing winds in place of his compass, Bernie steers CG 36500 toward home—a task made more difficult as Chatham loses power. Miriam and the other townspeople drive their cars to the pier and turn on their headlights to guide Bernie in.

The end of the film shows photographs from the event that briefly document the aftermath of the rescue. Two months later, Bernie and Miriam marry; they stay together for 58 years until Bernie's death in 2009. Bernie Webber and his crew receive the Gold Lifesaving Medal.

Cast

 Chris Pine as Boatswain's Mate First Class Bernard "Bernie" Webber
 Casey Affleck as Ray Sybert
 Ben Foster as Seaman Richard Livesey
 Holliday Grainger as Miriam Pentinen Webber
 Eric Bana as Chief Warrant Officer Daniel Cluff
 Graham McTavish as Frank "Pop" Fauteux
 Kyle Gallner as Engineman Third Class Andrew Fitzgerald
 Michael Raymond-James as A.B. Seaman D.A. Brown
 John Magaro as Seaman Ervin Maske
 Abraham Benrubi as George "Tiny" Myers
 Keiynan Lonsdale as Eldon Hanan
 John Ortiz as Seaman Wallace Quirey
 Beau Knapp as Mel "Gus" Gouthro
 Josh Stewart as Tchuda Southerland
 Rachel Brosnahan as Bea Hansen
 Matthew Maher as Carl Nickerson
 Benjamin Koldyke as Donald Bangs

Production
Walt Disney Pictures acquired the screen rights to Michael Tougias' 2009 book, The Finest Hours: The True Story of a Heroic Sea Rescue in August 2011. Paul Tamasy and Eric Johnson wrote the script based on the book and interviews they conducted with survivors. In May 2013, Robert Schwentke was hired to direct the film. However, Schwentke left the project to direct The Divergent Series: Insurgent, and was replaced with Craig Gillespie in April 2014. Casting was done from April through October 2014.

Principal photography began on September 8, 2014, in Quincy, Massachusetts. On October 27, the film was being shot at Fore River Shipyard in Quincy aboard . They were also set to film at various South Shore locations and then move to Chatham, Massachusetts, in December. In early December, filming was taking place in the town of Marshfield. Affleck was seen playing piano at Symphony Hall in Boston on December 12, during the Chatham shoot, and expressed to the Boston Globe that his experience shooting the film was "one of [his] best". Production designer Michael Corenblith reproduced the interior of Pendleton. Post-production lasted a year, with the film requiring nearly 1,000 visual effects shots. Moving Picture Company (MPC) was responsible for creating the majority of those shots.

Release

Walt Disney Studios Motion Pictures originally set The Finest Hours for release on April 15, 2016, and then October 9, 2015, until announcing a final release date of January 29, 2016. The first trailer for the film was released on July 8, 2015. A second trailer was released on November 11, 2015. The Finest Hours opened the Coronado Island Film Festival on January 15, 2016. The film held its world premiere at the TCL Chinese Theatre in Hollywood, California, on January 25, 2016. Walt Disney Studios Home Entertainment released the film on Blu-ray, DVD, and digital download on May 24, 2016.

Box office
The Finest Hours grossed $27.6 million in North America and $24.5 million in other territories for a worldwide total of $52.1 million.

The film was released in North America on January 29, 2016, alongside Kung Fu Panda 3, Fifty Shades of Black, and Jane Got a Gun. The film was projected to gross $10–13 million from 3,143 theaters in its opening weekend. The film grossed $375,000 from its Thursday night previews and $3.3 million on its first day. It went on to gross $10.3 million in its opening weekend, finishing 4th at the box office.

In March 2016, Variety reported Disney was expecting losses of around $75 million from the film.

Critical response
On Rotten Tomatoes, the film has an approval rating of 64% based on 195 reviews, with an average rating of 6/10. The site's consensus states, "Old-fashioned to a fault, The Finest Hours will satisfy those seeking a traditional rescue drama – but may leave more adventurous viewers wanting more." On Metacritic, the film has a score of 58 out of 100, based on 39 critics, indicating "mixed or average reviews". Audiences polled by CinemaScore gave the film an average grade of "A−" on an A+ to F scale.

Soundtrack

Conducted by Carter Burwell. Performed by the Hollywood Studio Symphony. Portions of Carter Burwell's score were replaced with music composed by Philip Klein, who had served as arranger on Burwell's score. Burwell chose to include two of Klein's tracks on the album. The album also includes five tracks that Burwell recorded, but which were replaced in the finished film.

Notes
Citations

References used

Further reading

External links

 
 
 

2016 films
2010s English-language films
2016 3D films
2010s disaster films
2016 action drama films
2016 action thriller films
American 3D films
American disaster films
American films based on actual events
American historical films
American action drama films
American action thriller films
Action films based on actual events
Drama films based on actual events
Disaster films based on actual events
Films about the United States Coast Guard
Films scored by Carter Burwell
Films based on non-fiction books
Films directed by Craig Gillespie
Films set in 1951
Films set in 1952
Films set in Massachusetts
Films set in the Atlantic Ocean
Films shot in Massachusetts
Films with screenplays by Scott Silver
IMAX films
Seafaring films based on actual events
Thriller films based on actual events
Walt Disney Pictures films
2010s American films